The 1973–74 Notre Dame Fighting Irish men's basketball team represented the University of Notre Dame during the 1973–74 season. The team was coached by Digger Phelps and was ranked in the Associated Press poll for the entirety of the season. On January 19, the Fighting Irish defeated UCLA 71-70, ending the Bruins' record 88-game winning streak.

Forward John Shumate was the team's captain and leading scorer, averaging 24.2 points per game. After the season, Shumate was selected as a first-team player on the 1974 All-America team.

The team finished 26-3, losing by a 77–68 score against Michigan in the NCAA tournament, and going on to finish third in the Mideast Regional.

Roster

Schedule and results

Rankings

Team players drafted into the NBA

References 

Notre Dame Fighting Irish
Notre Dame Fighting Irish
Notre Dame
Notre Dame
Notre Dame Fighting Irish men's basketball seasons